The 2019–20 Liga IV Giurgiu was the 39th season of Liga IV Giurgiu, the fourth tier of the Romanian football league system. The season began on 24 August 2019 and was scheduled to end in June 2020, but was suspended in March because of the COVID-19 pandemic in Romania. 

The season was ended officially on 25 July 2020 after a promotion play-off match between the teams in first place in the South and North Series.

Argeșul Mihăilești crowned as county champion.

Team changes

To Liga IV Giurgiu
Relegated from Liga III
 —
Promoted from Liga V Giurgiu
 Voința Daia
 Real Drăgăneasca
 Prundu

From Liga IV Giurgiu
Promoted to Liga III
 —
Relegated to Liga V Giurgiu
 —

Other changes
 Podu Doamnei was spared from relegation.
 Mihai Bravu was replaced by Progresul Valea Dragului.

Competition format
The league consisted of 32 teams divided into 2 series of 16 teams, South Series (Seria Sud) and North Series (Seria Nord) and will play a regular season, followed by a play-off. The regular season is a double round-robin tournament. At the end of regular season, the first 2 ranked teams in each series will qualify for championship play-off and the winner will participate for promotion play-off to Liga III.

League tables

South Series

North Series

Championship play-off

Argeșul Mihăilești won the 2019–20 Liga IV Giurgiu  and qualify for promotion play-off to Liga III.

Promotion play-off

Champions of Giurgiu County face champions of Liga IV – Bucharest and Liga IV – Ialomița County.

Region 6 (South)

Group B

See also

Main Leagues
 2019–20 Liga I
 2019–20 Liga II
 2019–20 Liga III
 2019–20 Liga IV

County Leagues (Liga IV series)

 2019–20 Liga IV Alba
 2019–20 Liga IV Arad
 2019–20 Liga IV Argeș
 2019–20 Liga IV Bacău
 2019–20 Liga IV Bihor
 2019–20 Liga IV Bistrița-Năsăud
 2019–20 Liga IV Botoșani
 2019–20 Liga IV Brăila
 2019–20 Liga IV Brașov
 2019–20 Liga IV Bucharest
 2019–20 Liga IV Buzău
 2019–20 Liga IV Călărași
 2019–20 Liga IV Caraș-Severin
 2019–20 Liga IV Cluj
 2019–20 Liga IV Constanța
 2019–20 Liga IV Covasna
 2019–20 Liga IV Dâmbovița
 2019–20 Liga IV Dolj 
 2019–20 Liga IV Galați
 2019–20 Liga IV Gorj
 2019–20 Liga IV Harghita
 2019–20 Liga IV Hunedoara
 2019–20 Liga IV Ialomița
 2019–20 Liga IV Iași
 2019–20 Liga IV Ilfov
 2019–20 Liga IV Maramureș
 2019–20 Liga IV Mehedinți
 2019–20 Liga IV Mureș
 2019–20 Liga IV Neamț
 2019–20 Liga IV Olt
 2019–20 Liga IV Prahova
 2019–20 Liga IV Sălaj
 2019–20 Liga IV Satu Mare
 2019–20 Liga IV Sibiu
 2019–20 Liga IV Suceava
 2019–20 Liga IV Teleorman
 2019–20 Liga IV Timiș
 2019–20 Liga IV Tulcea
 2019–20 Liga IV Vâlcea
 2019–20 Liga IV Vaslui
 2019–20 Liga IV Vrancea

References

External links
 Official website 

Liga IV seasons
Sport in Giurgiu County